Tilak Raj Behar (Hindi: तिलक राज बेहड़, born 1 February 1957) is an Indian politician. He is currently MLA, 67-Kichha Vidhan Sabha, Uttarakhand. He has been Health Minister in Government of Uttarakhand, Deputy Leader of Opposition of Uttarakhand Legislative Assembly and the Working President of Uttarakhand Pradesh Congress Committee

He has been elected to the Legislative Assembly of Uttar Pradesh/Uttarakhand five times - having won from Haldwani Assembly Constituency in Uttar Pradesh in 1993 and 1996, from Rudrapur-Kichha Assembly Constituency in Uttarakhand in 2002 and 2007, and from Kichha Assembly Constituency in Uttarakhand in 2022.

Behar is a member of the Indian National Congress (INC). He is the face of Congress in the Terai Region of Uttarakhand. He has served the people of Uttarakhand and Uttar Pradesh by serving in various capacities - some of them being (though not limited to) Minister of Health and Family Welfare, Minister of Transport, Food and Civil Supplies, Govt of Uttarakhand, Deputy Leader of Opposition in the State Assembly, Chairman of Mandi Parishad of Uttarakhand and Chairman of Uttarakhand State Seed and Organic Production Certification Agency.

Behar came to prominence through his handling of the Health Ministry in the state of Uttarakhand from 2002 to 2007 in the Narayan Dutt Tiwari Cabinet.

Public offices held

 MLA, Kichha Vidhan Sabha, Uttarakhand (2022–Present)
 Working President, Uttarakhand Pradesh Congress Committee (2021–Present)
 Chairman, Uttarakhand State Seed and Organic Production Certification Agency with Cabinet Minister Rank (2014–2016)
 Deputy Leader of Opposition, Uttarakhand Vidhan Sabha (2009–2012)
 MLA, Rudrapur-Kichha Vidhan Sabha, Uttarakhand (2007-2012)
 Minister of Health, Family Welfare, AYUSH and Medical Education, Govt. of Uttarakhand (2002–2007)
 MLA, Rudrapur-Kichha Vidhan Sabha, Uttarakhand (2002-2007)
 Minister of Transport, Food and Civil Supplies, Govt. of Uttarakhand (2001–2002)
 Chairman of Mandi Parishad of Uttarakhand with Cabinet Minister Rank (2000–2001)
 MLA, Haldwani Vidhan Sabha, UP (1996-2002)
 MLA, Haldwani Vidhan Sabha, UP (1993-1996)

References

Indian National Congress politicians
Uttarakhand MLAs 2022–2027
1957 births
Living people
People from Udham Singh Nagar district
Uttar Pradesh MLAs 1993–1996
Uttar Pradesh MLAs 1997–2002
Uttarakhand MLAs 2000–2002
Uttarakhand MLAs 2002–2007
Uttarakhand MLAs 2007–2012
State cabinet ministers of Uttarakhand
Uttarakhand politicians